José Chaparro (born 2 July 1954) is a Colombian former footballer. He played in four matches for the Colombia national football team in 1979. He was also part of Colombia's squad for the 1979 Copa América tournament.

References

External links
 

1954 births
Living people
Colombian footballers
Colombia international footballers
Place of birth missing (living people)
Association football midfielders
América de Cali footballers
Deportivo Pereira footballers